This list encompasses castles, palaces and stately homes described in German as Burg (castle), Festung (fort/fortress), Schloss (manor house) and Palais/Palast (palace). Many German castles after the Middle Ages were mainly built as royal or ducal palaces rather than as a fortified building.

Mecklenburg

 Schloss Bothmer, near Klütz
 Bülow Hunting Lodge, Bülow
 Dargun Palace (ruins), Dargun
 Festung Dömitz, Dömitz
 Friedrichsmoor Hunting Lodge, Neustadt-Glewe
 Schloss Gadebusch, Gadebusch
 Jagdschloss Gelbensande
 Grubenhagen Castle, Vollrathsruhe
 Güstrow Palace, Güstrow
 Schloss Hohenzieritz, Hohenzieritz
 Schloss Kaarz, Weitendorf
 Schloss Kittendorf, Kittendorf
 Liepser Schlösschen
 Ludwigslust Palace, Ludwigslust
 Schlossinsel Mirow, Mirow
 Alte Burg Neustadt-Glewe, Neustadt-Glewe
 Neues Schloss Neustadt-Glewe, Neustadt-Glewe
 Schloss Neustrelitz (destroyed), Neustrelitz
 Alte Burg Penzlin, Penzlin
 Schloss Neue Burg Penzlin, Penzlin
 Plau Castle, Plau am See
 Festungsanlage Poel, Poel
 Schloss Roggenhagen, near Neubrandenburg
 Schwerin Palace
 Stargard Castle, Burg Stargard
 Schloss/Rittergut Steinbeck (destroyed),  near Güstrow
 Stuer Castle, Stuer
 Schloss Varchentin, Varchentin
 Wesenberg Castle, Wesenberg
 Schloss Wiligrad, Lübstorf
 Wredenhagen Castle, Wredenhagen
 Löcknitz Castle

Vorpommern
 Conerow Castle (ruins), Wodarg
 Haus Demmin (ruins), Demmin
 Schloss Hohendorf
 Schloss Karlsburg, Karlsburg
 Klempenow Castle, Breest
 Landskron Castle (ruins)
 Löcknitz Castle, Lröcknitz
 Müggenburg Water Castle, Neuenkirchen near Anklam
 Osten Castle (ruins)
 Quitzin Hunting Lodge, near Grimmen
 Wasserschloss Quilow, near Anklam
 Schloss Schlemmin, Schlemmin
Spantekow Fortress, Spantekow
 Schloss Ueckermünde, Ueckermünde
 Schloss Wrodow

Isle of Rügen
 Jaromarsburg, Kap Arkona
 Granitz Hunting Lodge, near Binz
 Dwasieden Castle (destroyed), Sassnitz
 Putbus Palace (destroyed), Putbus
 Spyker Castle, Glowe

Isle of Usedom
 Wasserschloss Mellenthin (moated castle), Mellenthin
 Schloss Pudagla
 Schloss Stolpe

See also
List of castles
List of castles in Germany

 
Cas
Mecklenburg
Castles